Winston Mawdsley Graham OBE, born Winston Grime (30 June 1908 – 10 July 2003), was an English novelist best known for the Poldark series of historical novels set in Cornwall, though he also wrote numerous other works, including contemporary thrillers, period novels, short stories, non-fiction and plays. Winston Graham was the author's pseudonym until he changed his name by deed poll from Grime to Graham on 7 May 1947.

Biography
Graham was born in Victoria Park, Manchester, on 30 June 1908. As a child, Winston contracted pneumonia, and on medical advice was educated at a local day school rather than Manchester Grammar School which his father had in mind for him. Graham's father, Albert Grime, was a prosperous tea importer and grocer, but became incapacitated by a stroke.

When he was 17 years old, Winston moved to Perranporth, Cornwall, where he lived for 34 years. He had wanted to be a writer from an early age and, following the death of his father, he was supported by his mother while he wrote novels at home in longhand and attempted to get them published.

During his youth, Graham was a keen tennis player and recorded in his diaries how many sets he played each day. He lived in Perranporth from October 1925 until January 1960, then briefly, during the summer of 1960, in the south of France before finally settling in East Sussex. He was a member of the Society of Authors from 1945, chairman of the Society's Management Committee from 1967 to 1969 and a fellow of the Royal Society of Literature. In 1983, he was made an Officer of the Order of the British Empire.

In September 1939, Graham married Jean Williamson, having first met her in 1926 when she was 13 years old. She often helped Graham with ideas for his books, and the character of Demelza, in his Poldark series, was based in part on her. Graham's daughter said, "Father was the author but my mother helped with the details because she was very observant. She saw everything and remembered it all." Jean died in 1992. They had two children, economist  Andrew Graham and Rosamund Barteau.

Graham died on 10 July 2003 at the age of 95, at his house, 'Abbotswood' in Buxted, East Sussex. His autobiography, Memoirs of a Private Man, was published in September of that year.

Remembrances and legacy
The Royal Cornwall Museum in Truro, Cornwall had an exhibition devoted to his life and works (Poldark's Cornwall: The Life and Times of Winston Graham) from mid-June to mid-September 2008 to celebrate the centenary of his birth, coinciding with re-publication of the Poldark novels by Pan Macmillan.  Additionally, the Winston Graham Historical Prize was initiated as part of the Centenary Celebrations, funded by a legacy from the author and supported by Pan Macmillan. It is awarded for a work of unpublished fiction, preferably with an association with Cornwall. Details can be obtained from the Royal Cornwall Museum.

The majority of Winston Graham's manuscripts and papers have been donated to the Royal Institution of Cornwall by his son Andrew Graham and daughter Rosamund Barteau. Further papers are housed at the Howard Gotlieb Archival Research Center at Boston University and elsewhere.

Literary career

Graham's first novel The House with the Stained Glass Windows was published in 1934.

His first Poldark novel, Ross Poldark, was published in 1945 and was succeeded by 11 further titles, the last of which, Bella Poldark, was published in 2002. The series was set in Cornwall, especially in and near Perranporth where Graham lived for more than three decades (1925–1960).

In the 1941 spy thriller Night Journey, set mostly in Fascist Italy, the protagonist feels that Britain was likely to lose World War II, but is determined to go on fighting against all the odds. This was likely Graham's own feeling at the time.

Graham was also an accomplished author of suspense novels and, during the course of his life, wrote 30 novels (in addition to the 12 Poldark books) as well as a volume of short stories (The Japanese Girl, 1971) and three non-fiction works. Other than the Poldark novels, Graham's most successful works were Marnie, a suspense thriller published in 1961 and The Walking Stick, published in 1967. In 1955, Graham's novel The Little Walls won the Crime Writers' Association's first Crime Novel of the Year Award (then called The Crossed Red Herrings Award, later The Gold Dagger).

In 1972, Graham published The Spanish Armadas, a factual account of the sixteenth-century Anglo-Spanish conflict. (The plural "Armadas" refers to a lesser-known second attempt by Philip II of Spain to conquer England in 1597, which Graham argued was better planned and organised than the attempt in 1588, but was foiled by a fierce storm scattering the Spanish ships and sinking many of them.) The same is also the subject of a historical novel, The Grove of Eagles, set in Elizabethan Cornwall and also depicting the foundation and growth of Falmouth.

Graham wrote at least four plays in the 1930s: Seven Suspected, At Eight O'Clock Precisely, Values and Forsaking All Others and one - Shadow Play (renamed Circumstantial Evidence) - in the 1970s. The latter was produced professionally at Salisbury (as Shadow Play) in 1978 and at Guildford, Richmond and Brighton (as Circumstantial Evidence) in 1979. According to Graham, it "missed London by a hair". Seven Suspected (three acts) was first performed in Perranporth on 30 May 1933 and At Eight O'Clock Precisely (two acts) in Redruth on 18 April 1934, in both cases with the author and his wife-to-be Jean in the cast, Values was a one-act play performed by seven members of Perranporth Women's Institute at a Truro drama festival in 1936 and the full-length Forsaking All Others was not produced at all. (It was, however, revised into the author's eighth novel, Strangers Meeting.)

Graham's books have been translated into 30 languages. His autobiography Memoirs of a Private Man was published by Macmillan in September 2003, two months after his death.

Television and film adaptations of works
The first seven Poldark novels were adapted into two BBC television series broadcast in the UK between 1975 and 1977, which garnered audiences of about 14 million viewers.  The series were so successful that some vicars rescheduled or cancelled church services rather than have them clash with the broadcast of Poldark episodes. Graham disliked early episodes of Poldark so much (because of the portrayal of Demelza as promiscuous and 'loose') that he tried to have the first series cancelled, but could do nothing about it.

The Poldark novels have been adapted for television on two other occasions.

Graham's novel Marnie (1961), a thriller, was filmed by Alfred Hitchcock in 1964, with Tippi Hedren and Sean Connery in the lead roles.

Marnie (1961) was also adapted as a play by Sean O'Connor in 2001 and an opera written by Nico Muhly which premiered in November, 2017. Both the play and the opera retained the novel's British setting and bleak ending.

Five of Graham's other books have been filmed:
  Take My Life (1947 film co-scripted by Graham and subsequently novelised)
Night Without Stars (1951 film, scripted by Graham, based on the 1950 novel),
Fortune Is a Woman (1957 film released in the United States as She Played With Fire; based on the 1952 book Fortune Is a Woman),
Sócio de Alcova (1962 Brazil) / Carnival of Crime (1964 US), based on the book The Sleeping Partner (1956).
 The Walking Stick (1970 film based on the 1967 novel).

Bibliography

Poldark novels

 1945 – Ross Poldark (original U.S. title: The Renegade)
 1946 – Demelza 
 1950 – Jeremy Poldark (original U.S. title: Venture Once More)
 1953 – Warleggan (original U.S. title: The Last Gamble)
 1973 – The Black Moon
 1976 – The Four Swans
 1977 – The Angry Tide
 1981 – The Stranger from the Sea
 1982 – The Miller's Dance
 1984 – The Loving Cup
 1990 – The Twisted Sword
 2002 – Bella Poldark
 1983 – Poldark's Cornwall (non-fiction)

Other works

 1934 – The House with the Stained Glass Windows
 1935 – Into the Fog
 1935 – The Riddle of John Rowe
 1936 – Without Motive
 1937 – The Dangerous Pawn
 1938 – The Giant's Chair (revised edition, 1975, as Woman in the Mirror)
 1939 – Keys of Chance
 1939 – Strangers Meeting
 1940 – No Exit
 1941 – Night Journey (revised edition, 1966)
 1942 – My Turn Next (revised edition, 1988, as Cameo)
 1944 – The Merciless Ladies (revised edition, 1979)
 1945 – The Forgotten Story
 1947 – Take My Life
 1949 – Cordelia
 1950 – Night Without Stars
 1952 – Fortune Is a Woman
 1955 – The Little Walls (Gold Dagger Award)
 1956 – The Sleeping Partner (filmed as Sócio de Alcova/Carnival of Crime)
 1957 – Greek Fire
 1959 – The Tumbled House
 1961 – Marnie
 1963 – The Grove of Eagles
 1965 – After the Act
 1967 – The Walking Stick
 1970 – Angell, Pearl and Little God
 1971 – The Japanese Girl (short stories)
 1972 – The Spanish Armadas (non-fiction)
 1986 – The Green Flash
 1992 – Stephanie
 1995 – Tremor
 1998 – The Ugly Sister
 2003 – Memoirs of a Private Man (autobiography; posthumous)

References

External links

1908 births
2003 deaths
20th-century English dramatists and playwrights
20th-century English novelists
20th-century English male writers
21st-century English novelists
21st-century English male writers
21st-century English memoirists
Writers from Cornwall
English Anglicans
English historical novelists
English thriller writers
Officers of the Order of the British Empire
Fellows of the Royal Society of Literature
English male novelists
English male non-fiction writers
Writers of historical fiction set in the early modern period
Writers of historical fiction set in the modern age
People from Buxted